is a 2013 Japanese musical romance film starring Takeru Satoh and Sakurako Ohara. It is based on the Shōjo manga of the same name by Kotomi Aoki.

Synopsis
Story of a highly successful, yet reclusive music composer named Aki Ogasawara who becomes involved in a relationship with a 16-year-old fan on a whim while lying about his true identity. Eventually she gets recruited into the music industry herself, causing additional complications.

Cast

Main 
Takeru Satoh as Aki Ogasawara
A 25-year-old genius producer and bassist, who composes for the rock band "Crude Play" under the alias Soichiro. He used to be a member of the band with his three other childhood friends, but left the band right before their debut. He becomes depressed, and tries to find solace through music.
Sakurako Ohara as Riko Koeda
A 16-year-old high school student who possesses a gifted voice. She is in an amateur band "Mush & Co." with two of her childhood friends. Riko meets and falls in love with Aki at first sight, and tries to help him overcome his pain.

Supporting 
Shohei Miura as Shun Sakaguchi, guitarist and vocalist of "Crude Play"
Masataka Kubota as Shinya Shinohara, bassist of "Crude Play" who replaced Aki's position
Kouki Mizuta as Kaoru Ono, guitarist of "Crude Play"
Koudai Asaka as Teppei Yazaki, drummer of "Crude Play"	
Ryo Yoshizawa as Yuichi Kimijima, member of "Mush & Co."
Yuki Morinaga as Sota Yamazaki, member of "Mush & Co."
Saki Aibu as Mari, Aki's ex-girlfriend
Takashi Sorimachi as Soichiro Takagi, music producer and Aki's rival
Mitsuki Tanimura as Miwako Nagahama, Takagi's assistant
Maxwell Powers as Master of Ceremonies

Production
The live adaptation of the film was first announced in March 2012. Auditions were held from March to June 2012 to choose the female lead, Riko.

On March 6, 2013, it was announced that Sakurako Ohara was handpicked from 5000 applicants to play the female lead, Riko. This also marks her acting debut. Takeru Sato was also announced as the male lead, Aki.

Soundtrack

Prologue
A prologue drama series, titled A Story of Before She and I Met was aired on Fuji TV from December 9 for 10 episodes, with each episode lasting 10 minutes.

Box-office
By December 2013, the film had earned ¥164 million (US$1.59 million). By January 19, it had grossed ¥1.58 billion (US$15.13 million).

See also
The Liar and His Lover (TV series), 2017 South Korean television series
Sakurako Ohara

References

External links 
The Liar and His Lover on Internet Movie Database

2013 films
2010s Japanese-language films
Japanese musical films
Japanese romance films
Japanese teen films
Live-action films based on manga
Films directed by Norihiro Koizumi
2010s Japanese films